Solo Flights is the thirty-sixth studio album by Chet Atkins. Side one of this album features Atkins' experiment with the "Octabass Guitar," where he replaced the two low strings (the E and A strings) with heavier strings in order to drop an octave and create a fuller sound with bass.

This album was reissued on CD for the first time, in Japan only, on April 22, 2009

Reception

Writing for Allmusic, critic Richard S.  Ginell wrote of the album "All told, this is one of Atkins' more pleasing collections from that era."

Track listing

Side one
 "Drive In" (Rich) 2:15
 "Three Little Words" (Burt Kalmar, Harry Ruby) 2:35
 "Autumn Leaves" (Joseph Kosma, Jacques Prévert, Johnny Mercer) 3:25
 "Chet's Tune" (Cohen) 2:18
 "Mercy, Mercy, Mercy" (Joe Zawinul) 2:12
 "Cheek to Cheek" (Irving Berlin) 3:10

Side two
 "Cindy Oh Cindy" (Robert Barron, Burt Long) 2:25
 "When You Wish Upon a Star" (Ned Washington, Leigh Harline) 2:46
 "Music to Watch Girls By" (Sid Ramin, Tony Velona) 2:30
 "Choro da Saudade" (Agustín Barrios) 2:37
 "Gonna Get Along Without You Now" (Milton Kellem) 2:05
 "Georgy Girl" (Jim Dale, Tom Springfield) 2:45

Personnel
Chet Atkins – guitar

 Chet had heard of a guitarist by the name of Buddy Owens (no relation to Buck Owens) from Savannah, Ga who had his 1957 Gretsch Country Gentleman modified to accommodate two light gauge bass strings in place of the E (6th string) and A (5th string) to create the sound of a separate bass player behind you.  Buddy had this modification done years before Chet tried it.  Buddy had done some session work in Nashville, including playing on some of Loretta Lynn's recordings.  Buddy's Country Gentleman was modified by Randy Wood, a world class luthier also from Savannah.  I know Buddy, and I  personally played this guitar in 1983.  Buddy is still actively playing on stage as of 2021.

References

1968 albums
Chet Atkins albums
RCA Victor albums